This is a list of earthquakes in 1901. Only magnitude 6.0 or greater earthquakes appear on the list. Exceptions to this are earthquakes which have caused death, injury or damage. Events which occurred in remote areas will be excluded from the list as they wouldn't have generated significant media interest. All dates are listed according to UTC time. The countries and their flags are noted as they would have appeared in this year for example the Netherlands being in control of present-day Indonesia. In all another year of below average activity. There was 15 magnitude 7.0+ events. Japan saw a great deal of activity this year. The majority of the 125 deaths came in China from an event in February.

Overall

By death toll 

 Note: At least 10 casualties

By magnitude 

 Note: At least 7.0 magnitude

Notable events

January

February

March

April

May

June

August

September

October

November

December

References 

1901

1901